Berlin Westhafen is a station in the Moabit district of Berlin.

Overview

The S-Bahn station was opened in 1898 under the name Putlitzstraße, which is the street on which the station lies. Despite sustaining damage during the Second World War, the station remained in service. The U-Bahn station was opened on 28 August 1961, soon after the building of the Berlin Wall and also with the name Putlitzstraße, although no direct interchange with the S-Bahn station existed. In 1980 the S-Bahn station lost its service owing to cessation of services on the Western part of the Ringbahn (circle line).

After the Wall fell, S-Bahn services were gradually reinstated. In 1992, the U-Bahn station was renamed Westhafen after the nearby Westhafen port and on its reopening on 19 December 1999, the S-Bahn station also assumed this name. Once one of the least-frequented U-Bahn stations on the network, the whole complex has now won a significance as an interchange between S-Bahn and U-Bahn.
In the year 2000, the station was redesigned by artists Françoise Schein and Barbara Reiter: they installed the 1948 text of the Universal Declaration of Human Rights, juxtaposed with quotes of Heinrich Heine in German and French language.

References

External links

Westhafen station artist project

Westhafen
U9 (Berlin U-Bahn) stations
Railway stations in Germany opened in 1898
Railway stations in Germany opened in 1961
Westhafen
Westhafen